Zila Parishad means District Council and may refer to:
District Councils of Bangladesh
District Councils of India

See also
Panchayat Raj